At the 2019 European Games in Minsk, eight events of archery were contested, all in the target archery format. Five events were held with recurve bows and three with compound bows. The events in recurve are also used as Continental Qualification Tournament for the 2020 Summer Olympics.

Qualification
The WAE Executive Board approved the qualification system in November 2017. A total of 128 athletes qualified for the games, 96 in recurve and 32 in compound.

Summary

Recurve

Compound

Medal summary

Medal table

Recurve

Compound

References

External links
Results
Result Book

 
Sports at the 2019 European Games
European Games
2019